Burnt Offerings is a 1973 American horror novel by Robert Marasco. Its plot follows a family who move into a summer home where each member is plagued by unusual experiences and personality changes. Published by Delacorte Press, the novel had originally been conceived as a screenplay before Marasco rewrote it into a novel. It was adapted into a film of the same name in 1976. The novel was reprinted in 2015 by Valancourt Press.

Plot
The Rolfe family (Marian, Ben, and their son David) rent an isolated summer home in the remote North Fork of Suffolk County, New York at the extreme eastern end of Long Island to escape New York City and get away from their Queens apartment for the summer. Ben's aunt Elizabeth also moves into the home. Per their rental agreement, the Allardyces (the elderly siblings who own the home) stipulate that their elderly mother remain in her apartment in the top floor of the home and be fed three times a day, to which the Rolfes agree. Upon moving in, however, each member of the family is plagued by bizarre experiences, personality shifts, and inner turmoil that seems to be stemming from the house itself.

Critical reception
The New York Times declared that the novel "terrifies," writing that the "style is just opaque enough to keep us guessing what's real and what's imagined."

Publications
1973, Delacorte Press 
1976, Dell Books 
2012, Centipede Press 
2015, Valancourt Press

Adaptations
The film was adapted into a 1976 film of the same name starring Karen Black, Oliver Reed, and Bette Davis.

References

External links

Burnt Offerings at Goodreads
Burnt Offerings at Valancourt Books 

1973 American novels
American horror novels
American novels adapted into films
Novels set in New York (state)
Supernatural novels